Casey Moore (born July 26, 1980) is the former running backs coach for the Nevada Wolf Pack football team. He is a former American football player. Moore played college football at Stanford and was drafted by the Carolina Panthers. He was later picked up by the Arizona Cardinals, but never played in a regular season game for either the Panthers or the Cardinals.

Moore was an assistant coach at Stanford for two years from 2008 to 2009. In 2010, he was hired as the quality control coach for the Nevada Wolf Pack football team and a year later, he was promoted to running backs coach.

References

External links
 Nevada Wolf Pack biography

1980 births
Living people
American football fullbacks
Nevada Wolf Pack football coaches
People from Largo, Florida
Players of American football from Florida
Stanford Cardinal football coaches
Stanford Cardinal football players